Richard John Mills  , (born 14 November 1949) is an Australian conductor and composer. He is currently the artistic director of Victorian Opera, and formerly artistic director of the West Australian Opera and artistic consultant with Orchestra Victoria. He was commissioned by the Victoria State Opera to write his opera Summer of the Seventeenth Doll (1996) and by Opera Australia to write the opera Batavia (2001).

Career
Mills was born and grew up in Toowoomba, Queensland, and went to Nudgee College in Brisbane. He studied in London with Edmund Rubbra at the Guildhall School of Music and Drama and worked as a percussionist in England and for the Tasmanian Symphony Orchestra. Mills started conducting and composing in the 1980s.

In 1988, to celebrate the Australian Bicentenary, the Australian Broadcasting Corporation (ABC) commissioned Mills to re-orchestrate Charles Williams's Majestic Fanfare, the signature tune of ABC news and television broadcasts, in a more modern, Australian idiom.

He was engaged to conduct Opera Australia's first complete production of Richard Wagner's Der Ring des Nibelungen in the State Theatre, Melbourne, in 2013, the bicentenary of the composer's birth. On 5 June 2013, he withdrew from the Opera Australia Ring cycle.

Works

Works for the stage
 Snugglepot and Cuddlepie (1987), ballet
 Earth Poem / Sky Poem (1993), a music theatre work for Aboriginal dancers and musicians, orchestra and electronic sounds
 Summer of the Seventeenth Doll (1996), opera in two acts, libretto by Peter Goldsworthy after the play by Ray Lawler
 Batavia (2001), opera in three acts, libretto by Peter Goldsworthy
 The Love of the Nightingale (2007), opera in two acts, libretto by Timberlake Wertenbaker

Vocal and choral works
 Festival Folk Songs (1985) for mezzo-soprano, tenor, boy soprano, large mixed chorus, children's chorus, 2 brass choirs (optional) and orchestra
 Sappho Monologues (1991) for soprano and orchestra, texts after Sappho, edited by the composer
 Symphonic Poems (2001), setting of David Campbell and James McAuley poems for soprano, mezzo-soprano, bass, large mixed chorus, 3 brass bands
 The Little Mermaid (2005) for children's chorus, narrator, orchestra; text after Hans Christian Andersen
 Four Antiphons of the Blessed Virgin (2 September 2005, at the Ospedaletto, Venice) for tenor and organ
 Songlines of the Heart's Desire (2007), commissioned by the Ian Potter Trust, to poems by an anonymous fourth-century Chinese poet, Bengali Rabindranath Tagore, American Kenneth Patchen, French Tunisian Amina Said, and Australians John Shaw Neilson and Judith Wright.

Concertos
 Trumpet Concerto (1982) for trumpet and orchestra (written for Bruce Lamont)
 Soundscapes for Percussion and Orchestra (1983) for percussion solo and orchestra
 Fantastic Pantomimes (1987) for flute, oboe, clarinet, horn, trumpet and orchestra
 Cello Concerto (1990) for cello and orchestra (written for Raphael Wallfisch)
 Flute Concerto (1990) for flute and orchestra (written for James Galway)
 Violin Concerto (1992) for violin and orchestra
 Concerto for Violin and Viola (1993) for violin and viola solo and chamber orchestra (written for and premiered by Dene Olding and Irina Morozova)
 Double Concerto (2002) for violin and clarinet (written for Walter and Elsa Verdehr from Michigan State University)
 Double Concerto (2018) for two violins and strings (written for Melbourne Chamber Orchestra)

Orchestral
 Bamaga Diptych (1989)
 Tenebrae (1992)
 Pages from a secret journal
 Symphony of Nocturnes (2008)

Chamber works
 Sonata for Brass Quintet (1985)
 String Quartet No. 1 (1990), revised (2007)
 Four Miniatures (1992) for violin, clarinet and piano
 Here where death and life are met (no year) for high voice and piano, text by Judith Wright
 Requiem Diptych for Brass Quintet (1997)
 Songs without Words (1998) from the poems of Ern Malley for oboe and string quartet
 Jamaican Entertainment (2002) arrangements of music by Arthur Benjamin for flute, clarinet, soprano and piano, see: Two Jamaican Pieces).
 A Little Diary (2002) for clarinet and string quartet
 Woman to Man (2004) song cycle for mezzo-soprano and piano, text by Judith Wright
 String Quartet No. 2 (2007)
 String Quartet No. 3
 String Quartet No. 4, Glimpses from My Book of Dada (2010)
 Impromptu, after Schubert (2014)
 Lachrymae, Chorales… Postlude (2014) for string octet

Instrumental works
 Epithalamium (1985) for solo organ
 Pastoral for Solo Oboe (1993)
 Six Preludes for Solo Oboe (1991)

Educational works
 Little Suite for Orchestra (1983) for student orchestra
 Miniatures and Refrains (1986) for student string quartet
 Sonatina for String Quartet (1986) for student string quartet

Awards and nominations
In 1982, he won the Albert H. Maggs Composition Award.

In 1999, he was appointed a Member of the Order of Australia (AM).

In 2019, he was elected an Honorary Fellow of the Australian Academy of the Humanities (FAHA).

APRA Awards
The APRA Awards are held in Australia and New Zealand by the Australasian Performing Right Association to recognise songwriting skills, sales and airplay performance by its members annually.

! 
|-
| 2000 || Concerto for Violin and Viola by Tasmanian Symphony Orchestra (conductor Richard Mills) || Most Performed Contemporary Classical Composition ||  || 
|-
|rowspan="2" |2002 ||rowspan="2" | Batavia by Orchestra Victoria (conductor Richard Mills) || Best Performance of an Australian Composition ||  ||rowspan="2" | 
|-
| Vocal or Choral Work of the Year || 
|-
| 2005 || Concerto for Guitar and Strings by Karin Schaupp & Tasmanian Symphony Orchestra (conductor Richard Mills) || Orchestral Work of the Year ||  || 
|-
| 2008 || The Love of the Nightingale - Richard Mills || Best Composition by an Australian Composer ||  || 
|-
|rowspan="3" | 2009 || String Quartet No. 3 - Richard Mills || Best Performance of an Australian Composition ||  ||rowspan="3" | 
|-
| "Palm Court Suite" by Tasmanian Symphony Orchestra (Richard Mills)  ||rowspan="2" | Orchestral Work of the Year ||  
|-
| "Tivoli Dances" by Tasmanian Symphony Orchestra (Richard Mills) ||  
|-

ARIA Music Awards
The ARIA Music Awards is an annual awards ceremony that recognises excellence, innovation, and achievement across all genres of Australian music. They commenced in 1987. 

! 
|-
| 1999
| Ariel's Music (with Queensland Symphony Orchestra & Paul Dean 
| Best Classical Album
| 
|

Bernard Heinze Memorial Award
The Sir Bernard Heinze Memorial Award is given to a person who has made an outstanding contribution to music in Australia.

! 
|-
| 1996 || Richard Mills || Sir Bernard Heinze Memorial Award ||  || 
|-

Don Banks Music Award
The Don Banks Music Award was established in 1984 to publicly honour a senior artist of high distinction who has made an outstanding and sustained contribution to music in Australia. It was founded by the Australia Council in honour of Don Banks, Australian composer, performer and the first chair of its music board.

|-
| 1996
| Richard Mills
| Don Banks Music Award
| 
|-

Green Room Awards
 He received the Green Room Award in 2001 and 2002.

Helpmann Awards
The Helpmann Awards is an awards show, celebrating live entertainment and performing arts in Australia, presented by industry group Live Performance Australia (LPA) since 2001. 

! 
|-
|rowspan="2" | 2002 || Batavia – Richard Mills & Peter Goldsworthy || Helpmann Award for Best New Australian Work ||  ||rowspan="2" | 
|-
| Batavia – Richard Mills || Helpmann Award for Best Original Score || 
|-
| 2005 || The Love of the Nightingale || Helpmann Award for Best Performance in a Classical Concert ||  || 
|-
|rowspan="3" | 2007 || The Love of the Nightingale – Richard Mills & Timberlake Wertenbaker || Best New Australian Work ||  ||rowspan="3" |
|-
| The Love of the Nightingale – Richard Mills || Best Original Score || 
|-
| The Love of the Nightingale – Richard Mills || Best Music Direction || 
|-
| 2008 || Songlines for the Heart's Desire – Richard Mills || Best Original Score||  || 
|-
| 2012 || Elektra – Richard Mills || Best Musical Direction ||  || 
|-

References

External links
 Composer's home page
 Biography at Australian Music Centre
 Summer of the Seventeenth Doll synopsis in Opera~Opera
 Bruce Martin's reflections on creating the role of Francisco Pelsaert in Batavia (March 2006, Opera~Opera)

1949 births
Living people
20th-century classical composers
20th-century conductors (music)
21st-century classical composers
21st-century conductors (music)
Australian opera composers
Ballet composers
Alumni of the Guildhall School of Music and Drama
APRA Award winners
Artistic directors (music)
Australian conductors (music)
Australian male classical composers
Helpmann Award winners
People from Toowoomba
Winners of the Albert H. Maggs Composition Award
20th-century Australian male musicians
20th-century Australian musicians
21st-century Australian male musicians
21st-century Australian musicians
Members of the Order of Australia
Fellows of the Australian Academy of the Humanities